Nikolai Kann (26 April 1873, Rinsi, Kreis Ösel, Governorate of Livonia – 17 February 1948 Göttingen, British Zone, Allied-occupied Germany) was an Estonian educator and politician. He was a member of the Estonian Constituent Assembly, representing the Christian People's Party.

1920 he was Minister of Education.

References

1873 births
1948 deaths
People from Muhu Parish
People from Kreis Ösel
Eastern Orthodox Christians from Estonia
Christian People's Party (Estonia) politicians
Education and Social affairs ministers of Estonia
Members of the Estonian Constituent Assembly
Recipients of the Military Order of the Cross of the Eagle
Estonian World War II refugees
Estonian emigrants to Germany